John Mawurndjul (born 1951) is a highly regarded Australian contemporary Indigenous artist. He uses traditional motifs in innovative ways to express spiritual and cultural values, and is especially known for his distinctive and innovative creations based on a traditional cross-hatching style of bark painting technique known as rarrk.

Life
He is a member of the Kuninjku people of West Arnhem Land, Northern Territory, and grew up with only occasional contact with non-indigenous people and culture.

 he was living a traditional lifestyle at an outstation near Maningrida, still painting and hunting.

Art
He was tutored in rarrk, a traditional painting technique using fine cross-hatching and infill, in the 1970s by his uncle Peter Marralwanga and elder brother Jimmy Njiminjuma and began producing small paintings on bark. During the 1980s he began producing larger and more complex works, and in 1988 won a Rothmans Foundation Award.

During the 1990s his work was included in major exhibitions dealing with Aboriginal Australian art, such as Dreamings in New York (1988), Crossroads in Japan (1992), Aratjara: Art of the first Australians in Germany and the UK (1993–1994), and In the heart of Arnhem Land in France (2001).

In 2000, Mawurndjul's work was amongst that of eight individual and collaborative groups of Indigenous Australian artists shown in the prestigious Nicholas Hall at the Hermitage Museum in Russia. The exhibition received a positive reception from Russian critics, one of whom wrote: "This is an exhibition of contemporary art, not in the sense that it was done recently, but in that it is cased in the mentality, technology and philosophy of radical art of the most recent times. No one, other than the Aborigines of Australia, has succeeded in exhibiting such art at the Hermitage.

Also in 2000, his work was featured at the Sydney Biennale.

His work was subsequently the subject of a major retrospective in Basel, Switzerland (2005) and in the Sprengel Museum in Hanover, Germany (2006). In 2018–2019 an exhibition of his work was shown in the Museum of Contemporary Art Australia and afterwards as part of Tarnanthi 2018 at the Art Gallery of South Australia. This was the first major exhibition of his work in Australia.

Legacy
Mawurndjul has been a major influence on contemporary Kuninjku artists, and he has tutored his wife, Kay Lindjuwanga and daughter Anna Wurrkidj, who are now accomplished painters. He has created a whole school of artists and led an Australian art movement.

Recognition and awards
2003 saw Mawurndjul named by Australian Art Collector magazine as one of the country's 50 most collectible artists. His works have been singled out for praise by many critics, including Art Gallery of New South Wales senior curator Hetti Perkins, and artist Danie Mellor.

Australia Council for the Arts
The Australia Council for the Arts is the arts funding and advisory body for the Government of Australia. Since 1993, it has awarded a Red Ochre Award. It is presented to an outstanding Indigenous Australian (Aboriginal Australian or Torres Strait Islander) artist for lifetime achievement.

|-
| 2018
| himself
| Red Ochre Award
| 
|-

Collections
Mawurndjul is represented in many major public collections, including:

Art Gallery of New South Wales
Art Gallery of South Australia
Art Gallery of Western Australia
Artbank
Ballarat Fine Art Gallery
Djomi Museum, Maningrida
Kluge-Ruhe Aboriginal Art Collection of the University of Virginia
Museum and Art Gallery of the Northern Territory
Museum of Contemporary Art
National Gallery of Australia
National Gallery of Victoria
National Maritime Museum
Queensland Art Gallery

See also

List of Indigenous Australian visual artists

References

Further reading

Exhibition John Mawurndjul I am the old and the new Touring exhibition, 2018-2019
John Mawurndjul Art Gallery of New South Wales
John Mawurndjul Maningrida Arts & Culture
Where to buy or view John Mawurndjul's work Aboriginal Art Directory

Australian Aboriginal artists
People from the Northern Territory
Living people
1951 births
Australian contemporary artists
Artists from the Northern Territory